Giacinto della Calce, C.R. (1 January 1649 – 13 July 1715) was a Roman Catholic prelate who served as Bishop of Ariano (1697–1715).

Biography
Giacinto della Calce was born in Naples, Italy on 1 January 1649 and ordained a priest in the Congregation of Clerics Regular of the Divine Providence.
On 3 June 1697, he was appointed during the papacy of Pope Innocent XII as Bishop of Ariano.
On 9 June 1697, he was consecrated bishop by Sperello Sperelli, Bishop of Terni, with Michele de Bologna, Bishop of Isernia, and Matteo Gagliani, Bishop of Fondi, serving as co-consecrators. 
He served as Bishop of Ariano until his death on 13 July 1715.

References

External links and additional sources
 (for Chronology of Bishops) 
 (for Chronology of Bishops) 

17th-century Italian Roman Catholic bishops
18th-century Italian Roman Catholic bishops
Bishops appointed by Pope Innocent XII
Bishops of Ariano
1649 births
1715 deaths
Clergy from Naples
Theatine bishops